Zhujiang Brewery (Zhujiang Brewery Group Co., Ltd) was established in 1985 and is a large state-owned enterprise which deals mainly in beer and related products such as labels, cartons, crates, etc. The brewery is one of the largest single site production facilities in the world, and produces Zhujiang Beer.

Its headquarters is in Haizhu District.

Businesses

Wholly owned subsidiaries

Hong Kong Yongxin International Co
Guangzhou Baiyun Rongsen Packing Industrial Co
Zhujiang Brewery Group Labor Service Co., Ltd
Guangzhou Zhujiang Brewery Real Estate Co
Share-controlled subsidiaries
Guangzhou Zhufeng Color Printing Products Co., Ltd
Guangzhou Rongfeng Printing & Papers Products Enterprise Co., Ltd
Guangzhou Zhujiang Brewery Joint-stock Co., Ltd
Guangzhou Yongxin Zhujiang Brewery Co., Ltd
Shantou Zhujiang Brewery Bottling Co., Ltd
Haifeng Zhujiang Brewery Bottling Co., Ltd
Xinfeng Zhujiang Brewery Bottling Co., Ltd
Yangjiang Zhujiang Brewery Bottling Co., Ltd
Meizhou Zhujiang Brewery Bottling Co., Ltd
Guangzhou Conghua Zhujiang Brewery Bottling Co., Ltd
Shijiazhuang Zhujiang Brewery Co., Ltd
Zhanjiang Zhujiang Brewery Co., Ltd
Dongguan Zhujiang Brewery Co., Ltd
Zhongshan Zhujiang Brewery Co., Ltd
Hong Kong Dongjing Trading CO., Ltd
Guangzhou Xinye Advertising Co., Ltd
Guangzhou Rongxin Container Co., Ltd

Minor Share Subsidiaries 

Nanhai Yongxin Cork Manufacturing Co., Ltd
Guangzhou Julihang Exhibition Co., Ltd
Guangzhou Entrepreneur Club
Shanghai International Wine Development Co., Ltd

Others 
Guangzhou Dongwei Industrial & Development Co

Zhujiang beer
Zhujiang beer (珠江啤酒) is a 5.3% abv pale lager, and is one of 4 Chinese national beer brands. Zhujiang is a leading brand in China; 48,000 bottles are consumed per hour. It is particularly successful in the South of China. The beer is also exported to countries around the globe, including Canada, France, Australia, U.S., South Korea, Sweden and the UK.

Zhujiang is brewed in Guangzhou, in the South of China. The beer is named after the Pearl River, or Zhu Jiang, as Guangzhou is located in the Pearl River Delta. The beer is brewed with water piped from a natural spring source direct to the brewery to guarantee the quality and freshness. The fresh spring water is then combined with Czech hops, German yeast, and Canadian Barley Malt.

See also
Beer and breweries in China

References

Notes

External links
Zhujiang Beer website
Zhujiang Beer english website

Beer in China
Chinese alcoholic drinks
Government-owned companies of China
Manufacturing companies based in Guangzhou
Chinese companies established in 1985
Chinese brands